Scars Of My Days is a 2006 short film. It was produced in collaboration with the Swedish Institute and aired on TV5Monde.

Awards 

 First Time Director’s Golden Impala at Amakula Film Festival, 2006

Festivals 

 Tribeca Film Festival, New York, 2007

References

External links 
Scars of My Days at IMDb

Scars of My Days at Mubi

2006 short films
Rwandan short films